The 1987 Prague Skate was held November 1987. Medals were awarded in the disciplines of men's singles, ladies' singles and pair skating.

Men

Ladies

Pairs

Ice dancing

References

Prague Skate
Prague Skate